Allen House is located in Shrewsbury, Monmouth County, New Jersey, United States. The house which would later function as a tavern was built c. 1710 as a second residence for the Stillwell family of NY. Richard, a wealthy merchant, and his wife Mercy had eight children who were brought up primarily in Shrewsbury. By 1754, after Richard and Mercy had died, their heirs sold the property to Josiah Halstead who transformed the home into the Blue Ball Tavern, "the most noted tavern in Shrewsbury." Taverns served as community centers in the 18th century as much as places to drink and eat. The Vestry of Christ Church held meetings there as did the Shrewsbury Library Company and the Monmouth County Circuit Court.

During the American Revolutionary War in 1779, a Loyalist party raided the tavern where Continental troops were quartered. They killed 3 and captured 9 in what would become known as the Allen House Massacre. The house is furnished to reflect its use as a colonial tavern.

The tavern was added to the National Register of Historic Places on May 8, 1974.

The house is one of several houses owned and operated as a historic house museum by the Monmouth County Historical Association.

See also
National Register of Historic Places listings in Monmouth County, New Jersey
List of museums in New Jersey
List of the oldest buildings in New Jersey

References

External links

 
 Monmouth County Historical Association

Houses on the National Register of Historic Places in New Jersey
Georgian architecture in New Jersey
Houses completed in 1740
Houses in Monmouth County, New Jersey
Museums in Monmouth County, New Jersey
Historic house museums in New Jersey
National Register of Historic Places in Monmouth County, New Jersey
New Jersey Register of Historic Places
1740 establishments in New Jersey
Shrewsbury, New Jersey